Souanké is a city and capital of Souanké District in the Sangha Region of northwestern Republic of the Congo, located close to the border with Cameroon. The city is located around fifty kilometres north-east of Mont Nabemba, the highest point in the country.

The city is served by Souanké Airport.

Notable people
 

Gabriel Entcha-Ebia (born 1956), Congolese politician

References

Sangha Department (Republic of the Congo)
Populated places in the Republic of the Congo